Jami (formerly GNU Ring, SFLphone) is a SIP-compatible distributed peer-to-peer softphone and SIP-based instant messenger for Linux, Microsoft Windows, macOS, iOS, and Android.
Jami was developed and maintained by the Canadian company Savoir-faire Linux, and with the help of a global community of users and contributors, Jami positions itself as a potential free Skype replacement.

Jami is free and open-source software released under the GNU GPL-3.0-or-later. In November 2016, it became part of the GNU Project.

Two account types are currently available, and many of each type can be configured concurrently. Both types offer similar features including messaging, video and audio. The account types are SIP and Ring. A SIP account enables the Jami softphone to connect to a standard SIP server and a Ring account can register (or use an account set up) on the decentralised Jami network which requires no central server. By default, Jami uses a OpenDHT node maintained by Savoir-faire Linux to join the network when the user connects for the first time. However, the application gives users the choice to run this through their own bootstrap server in the advanced settings.

By adopting distributed hash table technology (as used, for instance, within the BitTorrent network), Jami creates its own network over which it can distribute directory functions, authentication and encryption across all systems connected to it.

Packages are available for all major Linux distributions including Debian, Fedora, and Ubuntu. Documentation is available on Ring's Tuleap wiki.

History 
Jami was initially known as SFLphone, and was one of the few softphones under Linux to support PulseAudio out of the box. The Ubuntu documentation recommended it for enterprise use because of features like conferencing and attended call transfer. In 2009, CIO magazine listed SFLphone among the top five open-source VoIP softphones to watch.

Design 
Jami is based on a MVC model, with a daemon (the model) and client (the view) communicating. The daemon handles all the processing including communication layer (SIP/IAX), audio capture and playback, and so on. The client is a graphical user interface. D-Bus can act as the controller enabling communication between the client and the daemon.

Features 

 SIP-compatible with OpenDHT support
 Unlimited number of calls
 Instant messaging
 Searchable call history
 Call recording
 Attended call transfer
 Automatic call answering
 Call holding
 Audio and video calls with multi-party audio and video conferencing
 Multi-channel audio support (experimental)
 Streaming of video and audio files during a call
 TLS and SRTP support
 Multiple audio codecs supported: G711u, G711a, GSM, Speex (8, 16, 32 kHz), Opus, G.722 (silence detection supported with Speex)
 Multiple SIP accounts support, with per-account STUN support and SIP presence subscription
 DTMF support
 Automatic Gain Control
 Account assistant wizard
 Global keyboard shortcuts
 Flac and Vorbis ringtone support
 Desktop notification: voicemail number, incoming call, information messages
 SIP Re-invite
 Address book integration in GNOME and KDE
 PulseAudio support
 Jack Audio Connection Kit support
 Locale settings: French, English, Russian, German, Chinese, Spanish, Italian, Vietnamese
 Automatic opening of incoming URL
 End-to-end encryption used for chat, video and voice
 Decentralised (no internet connection necessary)

See also 

 List of SIP software
 List of free and open-source software packages
 Comparison of instant messaging clients
 Comparison of VoIP software

References

External links 
 

Communication software
Free and open-source Android software
Free instant messaging clients
Free VoIP software
GNOME Applications
GNU Project software
Groupware
Instant messaging clients
Instant messaging clients that use GTK
Online chat
Software that was ported from GTK to Qt
Teleconferencing
Voice over IP clients that use GTK
VoIP software